Memari is a town and a municipality in Purba Bardhaman district in the Indian state of West Bengal.

Geography

Location
It has an average elevation of 25 metres (82 feet).

Urbanisation
95.54% of the population of Bardhaman Sadar South subdivision live in the rural areas. Only 4.46% of the population live in the urban areas, and that is the lowest proportion of urban population amongst the four subdivisions in Purba Bardhaman district. The map alongside presents some of the notable locations in the subdivision. All places marked in the map are linked in the larger full screen map.

Police station
Memari police station has jurisdiction over Memari municipal area, and Memari I and Memari II CD blocks. The area covered is 429.36 km2.

Demographics
As per the 2011 Census of India Memari had a total population of 41,451, of which 20,957 (51%) were males and 20,494 (49%) were females. Population below 6 years was 3,809.

 India census, Memari had a population of 36,191. Males constitute 52% of the population and females 48%. Memari has an average literacy rate of 69%, higher than the national average of 59.5%: male literacy is 75%, and female literacy is 63%. In Memari, 11% of the population is under 6 years of age.

Education
Memari College was established at Memari in 1981.

Memari has thirteen primary, and six higher secondary schools. Memari Vidyasagar memorial Institution (unit-1) & (unit-2) are the higher secondary schools, established in 1892. Memari Rasiklal Smriti Balika Vidyalaya school for girls. Memari al-amin Mission, Memari High Madrassa, Memari Jamiya Islamiya are the three major high schools.

Transport
Memari railway station is situated on the Howrah-Bardhaman main line  from Howrah Station.

SH 13/ GT Road, SH 15 passes through Memari.

Memari is a bus stop for many Express, Local buses are available from here. Buses bound Asansol, Bardhaman, Chuchura, Durgapur, Krishnanagar, Katwa, Nabadwip, Tarakeswar, Salar are available.

References

External links
 District map showing blocks
 Map of Bardhaman district

Cities and towns in Purba Bardhaman district